The City of Sunderland is a metropolitan borough with city status in the metropolitan county of Tyne and Wear, North East England. It is named after its largest settlement, Sunderland, spanning a far larger area, including nearby towns including Washington, Hetton-le-Hole and Houghton-le-Spring, as well as the surrounding suburban villages. The district also forms a large majority of Wearside which includes Chester-le-Street in County Durham. 

The district was formed in 1974 as part of the provisions of the Local Government Act 1972 and is an amalgamation of four former local government districts of County Durham. It was granted city status in 1992, the Ruby Jubilee of Queen Elizabeth II's accession to the throne. The borough had a population of 275,400 at the time of the 2011 census, with the majority of the population (174,286) residing in Sunderland.

History

The metropolitan borough was formed in 1974 under the Local Government Act 1972 by the merger of several districts of County Durham – Washington Urban District, Houghton-le-Spring Urban District and Hetton Urban District – with the County Borough of Sunderland.

The borough was granted city status on 20 May 1992 to celebrate the Queen's Ruby Jubilee. At the Queen's Golden Jubilee the city petitioned to be allowed a Lord Mayor, but was unsuccessful. Although the city does not have a Cathedral, as it is located in the Diocese of Durham, it does have Sunderland Minster.

Between 1939 and 1945 the Wear yards launched 245 merchant ships totalling 1.5 million tons, a quarter of the merchant tonnage produced in the UK at this period. Competition from overseas caused a downturn in demand for Sunderland built ships toward the end of the 20th century. The last shipyard in Sunderland closed in 1988.

St Benedict Biscop was adopted as the city's Patron Saint in March 2004.

City government

Functions
The Local Government Act 1972 created two different two-tier systems for local administration, with different division of functions. As a metropolitan authority, Sunderland retained responsibility for waste collection, although disposal of the waste was a county function, and for education. In 1986, when Tyne and Wear Metropolitan County Council was abolished, most county functions became the responsibility of the constituent districts, whilst new joint boards assumed the co-ordinating roles in the county. Thus control over economic development, of the Museums and Archive Service, of the Tyne and Wear Fire and Civil Defence Authority and of the Passenger Transport Authority is exercised not by committees of directly elected county councillors but by nominees chosen by the elected members of the five district authorities. 

Sunderland has not had a separate police force since 1967, when the Borough of Sunderland Police merged with Durham Constabulary. The city is now part of the Northumbria Police Force area. This force was set up in 1974, and covers the whole of Tyne and Wear plus the much larger but much less densely populated county of Northumberland.

The city is unparished, except for Hetton-le-Hole which is a civil parish, and which has a town council.

Political structure

The city has had a Labour controlled council since 1974, and often before that. After the elections of May 2003 the political structure was 63 Labour, 9 Conservative, and 1 independent. The only Liberal Party councillor sat with the only Liberal Democrat as a "Liberal/Democrat" group. Three Councillors resigned from the Labour Party following disputes over the selection of candidates for the 2004 elections. Two became independent members; one joined the Liberal Democrat party, becoming group leader after the 2004 municipal elections.

The reorganisation of electoral areas saw major changes in all but two wards, but the elections of 10 June 2004, the first fought under the new boundaries, saw little change in the political representation of the city as a whole, with 61 Labour, 12 Conservative, and 2 Liberal Democrat councillors elected.

The Conservative party won all three seats in a new ward whose boundaries spanned several old wards. The Liberal Democrats stronghold ward was abolished entirely, and became part of four new wards, and the Liberal Democrat councillors elected in 2004 were from two very different areas.

Following further disputes within the Labour Party, three councillors resigned the whip at the end of 2006 and, joined by one of the Liberal Democrat members formed an independent group, which is the minority party in opposition.

At the elections of May 2007, Labour lost three seats to the Conservatives, whilst former Labour Mayor Julianna Heron lost to an independent: the same person who had defeated her husband in 2003 and who was in turn defeated by him in 2004. The Conservative party made further significant gains in the 2008 election, gaining five additional seats.

The election in 2010, held at the same time as the general election saw Labour gain four seats to increase their majority. In the 2011 local elections Labour gained a further four seats from the Conservatives. After the 2015 General election the composition of the council was Labour 66, Conservative 6 and independent 3.

After the 2019 Sunderland City Council election, Sunderland became one of the few British councils with all five major parties represented. The council make up was Labour 51, Conservative 12, Liberal Democrats 8, UKIP 3 and Green Party 1.

Parliamentary constituencies
Since major boundary changes in 2010, there are three constituencies covering the City of Sunderland, all currently regarded as safe for the Labour Party:

Houghton and Sunderland South
Sunderland Central
Washington and Sunderland West

In the 1992, 1997, 2001 and 2005 General Elections, the former Sunderland South constituency was the first to declare the results, and the tradition was continued by the new Houghton and Sunderland South seat in 2010 and 2015.

Twin towns
Sunderland is twinned with two cities: Essen, Germany, and Saint-Nazaire, France. It also has Friendship Agreements with Washington, D.C., US; and Harbin and Nanjing, both in the People's Republic of China.

Sunderland and Washington share historical links, as the ancestors of the first President of the United States of America, George Washington, lived in Washington Old Hall, which is within the municipal boundaries of Sunderland.

Dialect

The so-called Mackem accent and dialect is often mistaken for Geordie by people not from the region, as the two tongues sound similar in pronunciation and diction.
The Sunderland dialect also has several variations between different areas of the city, as demonstrated when the hoax tapes purporting to be of the Yorkshire Ripper were analysed. The tapes were made by a man who came to be known as Wearside Jack, and were thought by linguistic experts to be made by someone specifically from the Castletown area of Sunderland. When the perpetrator, John Humble was eventually caught he confirmed that he did indeed attend school in the Castletown area of Sunderland in his childhood.

Demography

Ethnicity

Culture

Art and literature

Lewis Carroll was a frequent visitor to the area. He wrote most of Jabberwocky at Whitburn as well as "The Walrus and the Carpenter". Some parts of the area are also widely believed to be the inspiration for his Alice in Wonderland stories, such as Hylton Castle and Backhouse Park. There is a statue to Carroll in Whitburn library. Lewis Carroll was also a visitor to the Rectory of Holy Trinity Church, Southwick; then a township independent of Sunderland. Carroll's connection with Sunderland, and the area's history, is documented in Bryan Talbot's 2007 graphic novel Alice in Sunderland. More recently, Sunderland-born Terry Deary, writer of the series of Horrible Histories books, has achieved fame and success, and many others such as thriller writer Sheila Quigley, are following his lead.

The Salford-born painter, L. S. Lowry, was a frequent visitor, staying in the Seaburn Hotel in Sunderland. Many of his paintings of seascapes and shipbuilding are based on Wearside scenes. The Northern Gallery for Contemporary Art on Fawcett Street and Sunderland Museum and Winter Gardens showcase exhibitions and installations from up-and-coming and established artists alike, with the latter holding an extensive collection of Lowry's work. The National Glass Centre on Liberty Way also exhibits a number of glass sculptures.

The Bath-based writer, Dan W.Griffin was a student at Sunderland University between 1992 and 1995. His experiences are described in his book, No stranger to the P45.

Music

Sunderland has produced a modest number of musicians that have gone on to reach international fame, most notably Dave Stewart of the Eurythmics. Kenickie, which featured Lauren Laverne on vocals, also achieved a top ten album and wide critical acclaim in the mid-to-late 1990s. In recent years, a thriving underground music scene in Sunderland has helped the likes of Smalltown Heroes, The futureheads, Field Music, and more recently Frankie & The Heartstrings gain national recognition.

Other famous Sunderland musicians include punk rockers The Toy Dolls, who broke the top five of the charts with "Nellie the Elephant" in December 1984; the punk rock band Leatherface; the lead singer of dance outfit Olive, Ruth Ann Boyle, who achieved a UK chart-topper with "You're Not Alone" in May 1997 and has gone on to work with fellow chart-toppers Enigma; and A Tribe of Toffs, who made number 21 with their cult hit "John Kettley is a Weatherman" in December 1988.

On 7 and 8 May 2005, Sunderland played host to BBC Radio 1's Big Weekend concert—the UK's largest free music festival. The event, held at Herrington Country Park in the shadow of Penshaw Monument, was attended by 30,000 visitors and featured Foo Fighters, Kasabian, KT Tunstall, Chemical Brothers and The Black Eyed Peas.

The Empire Theatre sometimes plays host to music acts. In 2009, it hosts Jane McDonald and The Drifters among others.

The Sunderland Stadium of Light has hosted regular concerts since 2009, including the likes of Oasis, Take That, Coldplay, Kings of Leon and Red Hot Chili Peppers.

Theatre

The Sunderland Empire Theatre, opened in 1907, is the largest theatre in the North East, reopened in December 2004 following a major redevelopment allowing it to stage West End shows such as Miss Saigon, Starlight Express and My Fair Lady, all of which have been performed at the Empire. The Empire is the only theatre between Leeds and Glasgow large enough to accommodate such shows. It has also played host to an annual season from the Birmingham Royal Ballet for over ten years.

The Royalty Theatre is the home of the amateur Royalty Theatre group who also put on a number of low-budget productions throughout the year. Renowned film producer David Parfitt belonged to this company before achieving worldwide fame and is now a patron of the theatre.

The Empire also played host to the final performance of comic actor Sid James, who died of a heart attack whilst on stage in 1976.

Economy 
Sunderland is home to a Nissan car manufacturing plant.

Over recent years Sunderland city centre has seen a re-development of the Sunniside area taking place, with new bars, cafes and retailers opening their doors on the Eastern side of the city. The Sunniside area now includes an Empire Cinema, Gala Casino and many surrounding eateries.

The Bridges Shopping Centre covers much of the city centre and was opened in 1988. It is currently owned by Land Securities Group after they purchased the site in 1990. The centre receives over 26million shopping visits every year.

Media, internet, film and television 
Sunderland has two local newspapers: the daily evening tabloid, the Sunderland Echo, founded in 1873, and the Sunderland Star—a free newspaper. It also has its own local radio station Sun FM, a community radio station Spark Sunderland, and a hospital radio station – Radio Sunderland for Hospitals, and can receive other north-eastern independent radio stations Metro Radio, Greatest Hits North East, Capital North East and Heart North East. The current regional BBC radio station is BBC Radio Newcastle. The city is covered by BBC North East and Cumbria and ITV Tyne Tees, which has a regional office in the university's Media Centre.

Sunderland was named "The Facebook Capital of Britain"  by the BBC in February 2010. The statistics showed that people in Sunderland were more likely to log on to the social networking site than anywhere else in the UK.

Sport
The only professional sporting team in Sunderland is the football team, Sunderland A.F.C., which was formed in 1879, and plays home games at the 49,000-seat-capacity Stadium of Light.

Sunderland also has the north-east's top women's football team, Sunderland A.F.C. Women, who have been financially separated from the men's team since summer 2005. They currently play in the top tier of English women's football, FA Women's Premier League National Division, despite their financial struggles.

Sunderland's longest stadium occupancy so far was of Roker Park for 99 years beginning in 1898, with relocation taking place due to the stadium's confined location and the need to build an all-seater stadium. The initial relocation plan had been for a stadium to be situated alongside the Nissan factory, but these were abandoned in favour of the Stadium of Light at Monkwearmouth on the site of a colliery that had closed at the end of 1993.

Since the dissolution of Sunderland Nissan F.C., Sunderland itself now has only one non-league side, Sunderland Ryhope Community Association F.C. who now play in the Northern League Division One after a successful promotion campaign in the 2009/10 season. However, Washington F.C. also hail from Washington in the city.

People from Sunderland

See also
Sunderland (disambiguation)
Sunderland Economic Masterplan

References

External links
 

 
Metropolitan boroughs of Tyne and Wear
Cities in North East England
NUTS 3 statistical regions of the United Kingdom